First Greater Manchester is a bus operator in Greater Manchester. It is a subsidiary of FirstGroup. It was once a major operator in the northern areas of the county competing against Stagecoach Manchester which was dominant in southern areas of the county; however in recent years it has scaled back its operations, now primarily serving north eastern suburbs of Manchester, and the metropolitan boroughs of Oldham and Rochdale.

First operate the Vantage services from Folds Road, Bolton depot which they share with Arriva North West.

History

A timeline overview of public transport in Manchester, prior to 1993, is given here.

Before deregulation in 1986, buses in the Greater Manchester area were publicly funded and went under the name of Greater Manchester Transport. In 1986 Greater Manchester Transport became known as GM Buses, which was owned by the metropolitan borough and city councils of Greater Manchester, but were at arms' length from the local town halls.

In December 1993 GM Buses was split in two, GM Buses North and GM Buses South. It was planned that the two companies would compete against one another, but in reality they stuck to the sides of Manchester as indicated by their names.

In March 1994 GM Buses North was sold to a management buyout. By this stage many competitors were operating GM Buses routes following deregulation. In March 1996 GM Buses North was sold to FirstBus for £47 million and rebranded First Manchester. After a period of experimentation with the livery, a deep orange livery featuring a blue stripe was adopted.

First Manchester soon ended up managing two other FirstBus subsidiaries, First Potteries and First Pennine. That even included many GM Standard Leyland Atlanteans making their way to those two fleets. Eventually the First Pennine and Manchester subsidiaries were merged, adding a number of routes in the Tameside area to First Manchester. A new management team was put in place and First Manchester was relieved of its responsibility for the Potteries subsidiary.

Various depots have been closed over the past 12 years including Atherton (1998), Bolton Crook Street (2004) (replaced by a new depot at Weston Street), Knowsley (2008), Rochdale (2004) and Trafford Park (2005) sites at Lowton, Bolton and Manchester Piccadilly have also been used temporarily for either acquired fleet (Lowton/Bolton) in 1998 or for the Commonwealth Games in 2002 (Manchester Piccadilly).

As of September 2010 First Manchester has taken over the management of the Cheshire and Merseyside depots of First Potteries with the Staffordshire depots transferring to the management of the new First Midlands division. The Cheshire and Merseyside depots fell to a First Manchester licence. In February 2012, the company came under fire from Department for Transport North West's traffic commissioner after a performance survey found an average of 26% of First Manchester services were not running on time. The company were fined £285,000 in March 2012 for their poor reliability.

In Spring 2012 First Manchester was rebranded as First Greater Manchester. In June 2012, it was announced that FirstGroup were looking at selling off some of its operations, which included First Manchester's Wigan depot. On 2 December 2012, Stagecoach Manchester purchased the Wigan operation. The transaction saw 300 employees, 120 vehicles (although 20 were owned by Transport for Greater Manchester) and the Wigan depot purchased by the former A Mayne & Son legal entity.

On 1 August 2013, FirstGroup announced that subject to regulatory approval by the Office of Fair Trading, it had agreed to purchase the bus operations of south Manchester based company Finglands Coachways. The purchase included the lease of Finglands's depot in Rusholme, South Manchester routes and approximately 100 members of staff, but no buses. The deal was approved on 27 January 2014 with First taking over Finglands services on 9 February 2014. 

The FirstGroup began scaling back its operations in Greater Manchester in an attempt to stem financial losses across the group in 2017, closing its Bury and Tameside depots, with buses and operations transferring to its remaining three depots in Bolton, Queens Road and Rusholme, the latter of which would also close in January 2019. In February 2019, it was announced that the Queens Road depot in Cheetham Hill had been purchased by the Go-Ahead Group to form Go North West, which commenced operations on 2 June 2019, having acquired 25 bus routes and a fleet of over 160 buses from First. First's Bolton depot was then purchased by Rotala on 11 August 2019, expanding the operation of Diamond North West with the acquisition 18 routes, reducing First Greater Manchester to only its Oldham depot.

Services
First Greater Manchester mainly run services in central Manchester and the north eastern area of Greater Manchester including Oldham, Rochdale and parts of Tameside. 

First also operate services in the Wigan area, although following the sale of the Wigan depot to Stagecoach Manchester in December 2012, First only serve Astley, Atherton, Leigh and Tyldesley with the V1 & V2 Services that use the Leigh Guided Busway and the A580; these services are marketed as Vantage.

Metroshuttle

First Greater Manchester previously operated the three Metroshuttle services that operate around Manchester city centre. These services were free for passengers. The services were passed on to Go North West, following the sale of the Queens Road depot in June 2019.

Nightbus
First Greater Manchester operated several night bus services across Greater Manchester on Friday and Saturday nights. The routes mainly operated the same routes as their daytime equivalents with some exceptions, such as service 67 not serving Shudehill on nights, with service 135, which did not normally serve Shudehill, taking its place. The Nightbus services, mainly originating from Piccadilly Gardens bus station, ran to a frequency of either every 30 minutes or every hour from midnight to 3:30am and offered a flat fare ticketing system.

Until December 2012, First Greater Manchester also operated the Nightbus network in Wigan town centre, providing a number of late night services to various areas across Wigan, as well as the 598 service to Leigh, which allowed connection with the 39 service to and from Manchester. From 2 December 2012, the Wigan Nightbus network passed to Stagecoach Manchester with the sale of First Greater Manchester's Wigan operations.

In January 2015, First Greater Manchester withdrew six night bus journeys which served Rochdale, Bury and Eccles, including service 135, as part of wide-ranging cuts to its bus network. In Spring 2016, First's remaining night bus services were withdrawn on services 8, 36 and 39 due to low passenger numbers.

Vantage

On 3 April 2016, First Greater Manchester commenced operating services on the 4.5 mile North West Guided busway between Leigh and Ellenbrook under the Vantage brand.

Fleet
As of April 2020, the First Greater Manchester fleet consisted of 195 buses. 

Prior to the sale of the Bolton and Queens Road depots in 2019, First Greater Manchester operated a fleet of 583 buses, consisting mainly of Wrightbus-bodied Volvos and Alexander Dennis Enviro400s. Up to 160 buses at Queens Road were sold to Go North West and 125 buses based at Bolton were dispersed within the FirstGroup following a period on lease to Diamond North West.

First Greater Manchester are planning to electrify their remaining Oldham fleet, trialling a Mellor Sigma 10 in March 2023.

Route branding

First Greater Manchester originally branded their frequent services as an Overground. Based on the London Underground network where each frequent service is given a recognisable colour, each Overground service was also allocated its own colour line. The concept was a prominent fixture on network maps and coloured vinyls applied to the buses frequently serving those routes. However, the brand has largely been dropped. 

Usually, the colours are allocated randomly. However, the 180/184 was allocated the Purple line when the services were made into an Overground route in 2004 and the 184 was extended to Huddersfield replacing service 365. The extension also saw the 184 service incorporated into the Huddersfield Overground with services 348, 350 and 352 (which were later replaced by routes 181, 182, 183 and 185 to fit in with the 184) already branded as the Purple line (as had the 365 previously).

Due to ongoing fleet modernisation most Overground services are currently unbranded, with only the 180/184 and 409 having significant route branding. Former route, Route 100 was previously branded as "unmissable", route X34 branded as "Spinning Jenny" and route X35 as "Flying Shuttle", rather than with a colour line.

Heritage liveries

In 2013, First Greater Manchester repainted eight buses into the liveries of former transport companies to create a heritage fleet across their operating areas, which acknowledges the preceding companies that would eventually become First Greater Manchester.

Three Volvo B7RLEs were painted into the liveries of Bolton Corporation Transport, Oldham Corporation and Ramsbottom Urban District Council, while five Volvo B9TLs were painted into liveries of Bury Corporation, Manchester City Transport, Rochdale Corporation, Salford City Transport and Lancashire United Transport.

See also
Timeline of public passenger transport operations in Manchester

References

External links
Company website

Bus operators in Greater Manchester
FirstGroup bus operators in England
Transport companies established in 1996
1996 establishments in England